Eduardo Trillini (born 20 June 1958) is an Argentine former cyclist. He competed in the team pursuit event at the 1984 Summer Olympics.

References

External links
 

1958 births
Living people
Argentine male cyclists
Olympic cyclists of Argentina
Cyclists at the 1984 Summer Olympics
Cyclists from Buenos Aires
Pan American Games medalists in cycling
Pan American Games bronze medalists for Argentina
Cyclists at the 1979 Pan American Games